Sir James Reginald Alfred Bottomley,  (12 January 1920 – 5 June 2013)  was a British diplomat.

He was born in London, the son of Sir (William) Cecil Bottomley, one time Senior Crown Agent, and Alice Bottomley, one time lecturer at the London School of Economics, daughter of Sir Richard Robinson.

Jim Bottomley was educated at King's College School and Trinity College, Cambridge; he was President of the Cambridge Union Society in 1940, closing the debates to prevent proctoral censorship. In World War II he served in the Inns of Court Regiment, RAC, 1940–46 and was seriously wounded at Pont de Vère near Flers in Normandy in August 1944, requiring two years of surgery to repair his jaw.

He joined the Dominions Office in 1946, which became the Commonwealth Relations Office, and then the Foreign and Commonwealth Office, serving in London, Pretoria (1948–50), Karachi (1953–55), Washington DC for three years before the UN in New York(1955–59) and Kuala Lumpur (1963–67). In 1968 he undertook a supposedly secret mission to Salisbury, Rhodesia to restart talks with Ian Smith on Rhodesia's unilateral declaration of independence.  Member, British Overseas Trade Board, 1972. He was British Ambassador to South Africa 1973–1976, and Permanent UK Representative to the UN and other international Organisations at Geneva 1976–78, at which point he retired from diplomatic service. He was a director of Johnson Matthey plc from 1979–85.

He was appointed CMG in 1965, and KCMG in 1973.

He married on 23 August 1941, at Cheswardine, Shropshire, Barbara Vardon; they had two daughters and three sons, one of whom died young. The survivors became involved in computing, politics, teaching and statistics. The Conservative MP Sir Peter Bottomley is his son; the economist and former Labour MP and Treasury Minister Kitty Ussher is his granddaughter.

Barbara predeceased Jim in 1994. Bottomley survived her until his death, aged 93, in June 2013.  After cremation at Cambridge (where the couple moved after his retirement), his ashes were buried in Cheswardine churchyard along with those of his wife and their predeceased son.

References

Who's Who 2008

1920 births
2013 deaths
Military personnel from London
People educated at King's College School, London
Alumni of Trinity College, Cambridge
British Army personnel of World War II
Permanent Representatives of the United Kingdom to the United Nations
Ambassadors and High Commissioners of the United Kingdom to South Africa
Knights Commander of the Order of St Michael and St George
Presidents of the Cambridge Union
London Regiment officers
Royal Armoured Corps officers
British expatriates in the United States
British expatriates in Switzerland
British expatriates in Pakistan
British expatriates in Malaysia
Civil servants in the Commonwealth Relations Office